Robert Cooper Allworth  (10 March 1943 - 26 February 2017) was an Australian composer. His album of his composition Last Look at Bronte was nominated for the 1987 ARIA Awards for Best Classical Album.

In the 1997 Australia Day Honours he was awarded the Medal of the Order of Australia (OAM) for "service to music as a composer and as an advocate of other Australian composers' works".

Biography 

Robert Cooper Allworth, was born as Robert Graham Allworth on 10 March 1943, the only child of Australian Army officer, Kenneth Reginald Allworth (11 December 1905–26 March 1969) and Gwendolyn ( Jones,  1906–5 May 1969). He was raised in the northern Sydney suburb of Denistone. While a school student he undertook piano lessons and studied musical theory. As a teenager he was inspired by Arnold Schoenberg's "12-tone style of modern classical music." Late in 1969, after his parents' deaths, he returned to Denistone where he lived with his domestic partner, William Parsons.

His composition, "Past Horizons", was written in 1964 for solo piano. In 1965 one of his piano sonatas was chosen for performance in Stockholm by the International Society of Contemporary Music. In December 1995 "Past Horizons" was recorded by Larry Sitsky at radio station 2MBS and issued on The Glasshouse Suite: Music of Australian Composers by various artists in the following year via Jade Records.

Discography

Albums

Awards and nominations

ARIA Music Awards
The ARIA Music Awards is an annual awards ceremony that recognises excellence, innovation, and achievement across all genres of Australian music. They commenced in 1987. 

! 
|-
| 1987
| Last Look at Bronte
| Best Classical Album
| 
|rowspan="2" | 
|-

References

External links
Robert Allworth catalogue search at the National Library of Australia

Australian male classical composers
2017 deaths
1943 births
Recipients of the Medal of the Order of Australia